The Fiat 527 (also known as Fiat Ardita 2500) is a six-cylinder passenger car produced by Fiat between 1934 and 1936. The 527 was a larger-engined and more luxurious version of the four-cylinder 518 Ardita.

Unlike the four-cylinder Ardita, the 527 was not assembled outside Italy. Approximately 1,000 were produced.

Engines

References
 

522
Cars introduced in 1934